Mount Aeolus is a prominent peak, over  high, between Mount Boreas and Mount Hercules in the Olympus Range of Victoria Land. It was named by the Victoria University of Wellington Antarctic Expedition (1958–59) for Aeolus, the Greek god of the winds.

Mountains of Victoria Land
Scott Coast